Tomorrow Is Another Day is a 1951 crime drama film noir directed by Felix E. Feist and starring Ruth Roman and Steve Cochran.  An ex-convict who thinks he killed a man goes into hiding with a woman whose boyfriend is the man he supposedly killed.

Plot
Convicted of murdering his abusive father at age 13, Bill Clark is freed after 18 years behind bars. On his release, Bill meets Dan Monroe, who seems to be friendly, but is angered when he discovers that Monroe is a reporter exploiting Bill for a sensational story about the released "boy killer."  Now wary of people and unused to women, Bill is attracted to taxi dancer Cathy "Cay" Higgins, who initially rejects his advances. After he gifts her a watch and they tour the city together, she invites him up to her apartment. There, the couple is confronted by George Conover, Cathy's estranged boyfriend, who orders Bill to leave and pulls a gun. Bill attacks Conover and gets hold of the gun, but is knocked unconscious. Cathy retrieves the gun, shooting Conover when he moves toward her. The badly wounded man staggers out of the apartment and hails a cab. When Bill comes to, he finds Cathy packing to leave.

Cathy informs Bill that Conover is actually a New York police detective and urges him to go his own way, believing that the policeman would not want publicity from pressing charges for the shooting. She tells him she is going to her brother's home in New Jersey, to lie low. Later, Bill discovers that Conover has been hospitalized and that his assailant is being sought. Terrified that he may be responsible, he tracks Cathy down at her brother's home.

When she realizes that Bill has no memory of what happened, Cathy leads him to believe that he had shot Conover just before passing out. After hearing a radio report on Conover's death, the two resolve to go on the lam together. Cathy's brother allows them to borrow his car to cross the state line. At a diner, the couple abandon the brother's car and manage to stow away in an auto mounted on a car carrier. Initially at odds with each other, the couple's feelings begin to warm and Bill persuades Cathy to marry him under assumed names.

The couple continue to hitch-hike, learning more about each other and growing closer along the way. In California, they meet Henry and Stella Dawson and their son, who are heading toward the lettuce fields of Salinas. Bill and Cathy are persuaded to join them, and they find honest work and happiness, making a comfortable home out of their workers cottage.

Eventually, Henry sees Bill's picture in a true crime magazine which has advertised a one-thousand dollar reward for information about him. Henry is eager to turn Bill in for the reward, but he relents when Stella insists that it would not be right. However, Bill becomes suspicious about what Henry knows and might do, and declines to go fishing with him the next day. He is tempted to run away, but Cathy announces that she is pregnant.

That next day, Henry is badly injured in a car accident, and Stella gives into temptation for the reward money. When Bill sees a police officer walking from the Dawsons' cabin to theirs, he prepares to attack him with a scythe. In an attempt to stop him, Cathy confesses that she was the one who had shot Conover. Bill refuses to believe this, and carries on as planned. As the policeman nears, Cathy stops Bill by shooting him in the shoulder. In custody and back in New York, Bill and Cathy each confess separately to killing Conover in order to spare the other. The district attorney, however, informs them that Conover had confessed before dying that he had been shot in self-defense and that the police had never really been looking for either of them. The couple is finally released to resume their life together.

Cast
 Ruth Roman as Cathy "Cay" Higgins
 Steve Cochran as William "Bill" Clark
 Lurene Tuttle as Stella Dawson
 Ray Teal as Henry Dawson
 Morris Ankrum as Hugh Wagner
 John Kellogg as Dan Monroe
 Lee Patrick as Janet Higgins
 Hugh Sanders as Detective Lt. George Conover
 Stuart Randall as Frank Higgins
 Robert Hyatt as Johnny Dawson
 Harry Antrim as Warden
 Walter Sande as Sheriff

Reception
The film earned $1.7 million (adjusted to $30.5 million in current dollars) at the box office.

A review in The New York Times was dismissive: "Apart from one sequence when the pair hide in a car being transported by truck to effect their escape, "Tomorrow Is Another Day" follows an ancient formula. Its tensions are manufactured and apparent. List "Tomorrow Is Another Day" as just another picture."

Contemporary film critic Dennis Schwartz writes, "Gloomy minor film noir with a happy ending. The movie was made for John Garfield, but he died in 1952. A satisfactory Steve Cochran takes the part and gives it his best shot. Competently directed by Felix Feist (The Devil Thumbs a Ride/The Threat/Donovan's Brain), as always, and adequately written by Guy Endore (blacklisted after the movie for his political activism) and Art Cohn. Though watchable, the social conscious film remains forgettable--unable to leave a particularly sympathetic lasting impression of its outsider characters, whose distrust of the authorities leads them to be anti-social types and humorless downers for most of the pic."

Film noir historian Eddie Muller ranks the film as number 20 out of "25 noir films that will stand the test of time."

References

External links 
 
 
 
 
 Tomorrow Is Another Day informational site and DVD review at DVD Beaver (includes images)

1951 films
1951 crime drama films
American crime drama films
American black-and-white films
Film noir
Films directed by Felix E. Feist
Warner Bros. films
Films produced by Henry Blanke
Films scored by Daniele Amfitheatrof
1950s English-language films
1950s American films